Cogito may refer to:
 Cogito ergo sum, philosophical proposition (English: "I think, therefore I am")
 Cogito (magazine), a philosophical magazine
 Cogito (software), a frontend to the git revision control software
 Cogito (data warehouse), an SQL database server